Hurricanes SC (formerly known as Carib Hurricane FC) is a Grenadian football team from Victoria that plays in the Grenada Premier Division. 1,000 capacity Alston George Park is their home stadium.

Current squad

|-----
! colspan="9" bgcolor="#B0D3FB" align="left" |
|----- bgcolor="#DFEDFD"

|-----
! colspan="9" bgcolor="#B0D3FB" align="left" |
|----- bgcolor="#DFEDFD"

|-----
! colspan="9" bgcolor="#B0D3FB" align="left" |
|----- bgcolor="#DFEDFD"

References

External links
Club Profile

Football clubs in Grenada